The 2001–02 NBA season was the Lakers' 54th season in the National Basketball Association, and 42nd in the city of Los Angeles. The Lakers entered the season as the two-time defending NBA champions, having defeated the Philadelphia 76ers in five games in the 2001 NBA Finals, winning their thirteenth NBA championship.

Off-season
During the off-season, the Lakers signed free agents, All-Star guard Mitch Richmond and Samaki Walker, and acquired Lindsey Hunter from the Milwaukee Bucks.

Results
The team got off to a fast start winning their first seven games, leading to a successful 16–1 start after a nine-game winning streak between November and December, and holding a 33–13 record at the All-Star break. The Lakers finished second in the Pacific Division with a 58–24 record. Kobe Bryant and Shaquille O'Neal were both selected for the 2002 NBA All-Star Game, in which Bryant won MVP honors despite being booed by the hometown crowd in Philadelphia, but O'Neal did not participate in the All-Star game due to an injury for the second year in a row.

After sweeping the Portland Trail Blazers 3–0 in the Western Conference First Round of the playoffs, then defeating the 2nd-seeded San Antonio Spurs 4–1 in the Western Conference Semi-finals, the Lakers were pushed to the brink once more in the Western Conference Finals by the top-seeded Sacramento Kings, trailing 3–2, but managed to win the series in seven games. Game 6 of the Lakers-Kings series was one of the most controversial games in NBA history, due to the calls made by the referees (most of which were to the detriment of the Kings) and with the Lakers winning 106–102 at home. Game 7 of the Western Conference Finals on June 2 brought in a total of 23.8 million viewers, making it the most-watched Western Conference Finals game in NBA history. The Lakers then went on to win the NBA Finals, defeating and sweeping the New Jersey Nets in four straight games for their second three-peat in franchise history, the first since 1952–54. O’Neal was named Finals MVP for the third straight year.

Player statistics
Bryant averaged 25.2 points, 5.5 rebounds, 5.5 assists and 1.5 steals per game, while O’Neal averaged 27.2 points, 10.7 rebounds and 2.0 blocks per game, and Derek Fisher provided the team with 11.2 points per game. In addition, Rick Fox contributed 7.9 points and 4.7 rebounds per game, while Robert Horry provided with 6.8 points and 5.9 rebounds per game, and Walker averaged 6.7 points and 7.0 rebounds per game. Both Bryant and O'Neal were named to the All-NBA First Team, while Bryant was selected to the NBA All-Defensive Second Team. Shaq finished in third place in Most Valuable Player voting with 15 first-place votes (696 points), and Kobe finished in fifth place in MVP voting with 1 first-place vote. Bryant also finished tied in third place in Defensive Player of the Year voting.

Aftermath
Following the season, Richmond retired ending his fourteen-year career in the NBA, and Hunter was traded to the Toronto Raptors. The Lakers would not win another title until 2009, in which they defeated the Orlando Magic in five games. As of 2022, the Lakers are the most recent NBA team to have accomplished a three-peat.

Draft picks

 The Los Angeles Lakers did not have any Draft Picks.
 The Lakers owned the 27th Pick Overall and it was sent to New York.
 They also owned the 56th Pick Overall and it was sent to San Antonio.

Roster

Regular season

Season standings

Record vs. opponents

Game log

Regular season

|- style="background:#cfc;"
| 1
| October 30
| Portland
| W 98–87
| Bryant & O'Neal (29)
| Shaquille O'Neal (18)
| Shaquille O'Neal (5)
| Staples Center18,997
| 1–0

|- style="background:#cfc;"
| 2
| November 1
| @ Utah
| W 105–101
| Kobe Bryant (39)
| Rick Fox (8)
| Kobe Bryant (8)
| Delta Center19,539
| 2–0
|- style="background:#cfc;"
| 3
| November 2
| Phoenix
| W 117–94
| Shaquille O'Neal (36)
| Shaquille O'Neal (13)
| Kobe Bryant (9)
| Staples Center18,997
| 3–0
|- style="background:#cfc;"
| 4
| November 4
| Utah
| W 100–96
| Kobe Bryant (38)
| Shaquille O'Neal (8)
| Kobe Bryant (7)
| Staples Center18,997
| 4–0
|- style="background:#cfc;"
| 5
| November 9
| Memphis
| W 100–86
| Shaquille O'Neal (20)
| Shaquille O'Neal (8)
| Kobe Bryant (7)
| Staples Center18,997
| 5–0
|- style="background:#cfc;"
| 6
| November 11
| Orlando
| W 108–95
| Shaquille O'Neal (38)
| Shaquille O'Neal (18)
| Kobe Bryant (8)
| Staples Center18,997
| 6–0
|- style="background:#cfc;"
| 7
| November 15
| @ Houston
| W 98–97 (OT)
| Kobe Bryant (31)
| Shaquille O'Neal (13)
| Rick Fox (6)
| Compaq Center16,285
| 7–0
|- style="background:#fcc;"
| 8
| November 16
| @ Phoenix
| L 83–95
| Shaquille O'Neal (28)
| Shaquille O'Neal (12)
| Kobe Bryant (5)
| America West Arena19,023
| 7–1
|- style="background:#cfc;"
| 9
| November 18
| Sacramento
| W 93–85
| Kobe Bryant (29)
| Shaquille O'Neal (15)
| Kobe Bryant (8)
| Staples Center18,997
| 8–1
|- style="background:#cfc;"
| 10
| November 20
| @ L.A. Clippers
| W 98–93
| Kobe Bryant (25)
| Shaquille O'Neal (11)
| Kobe Bryant (12)
| Staples Center20,316
| 9–1
|- style="background:#cfc;"
| 11
| November 21
| @ Denver
| W 89–68
| Kobe Bryant (24)
| Bryant & O'Neal (13)
| Kobe Bryant (7)
| Pepsi Center19,521
| 10–1
|- style="background:#cfc;"
| 12
| November 23
| Golden State
| W 106–90
| Kobe Bryant (28)
| Shaquille O'Neal (10)
| Rick Fox (5)
| Staples Center18,997
| 11–1
|- style="background:#cfc;"
| 13
| November 25
| Denver
| W 105–98
| Kobe Bryant (25)
| Kobe Bryant (7)
| Kobe Bryant (7)
| Staples Center18,997
| 12–1
|- style="background:#cfc;"
| 14
| November 27
| Milwaukee
| W 104–85
| Kobe Bryant (33)
| Samaki Walker (11)
| Shaquille O'Neal (5)
| Staples Center18,997
| 13–1
|- style="background:#cfc;"
| 15
| November 30
| @ Seattle
| W 107–92
| Kobe Bryant (30)
| Slava Medvedenko (7)
| Robert Horry (8)
| KeyArena17,072
| 14–1

|- style="background:#cfc;"
| 16
| December 1
| Minnesota
| W 102–76
| Shaquille O'Neal (23)
| Shaquille O'Neal (9)
| 3 players tied (5)
| Staples Center18,997
| 15–1
|- style="background:#cfc;"
| 17
| December 5
| Dallas
| W 98–94
| Shaquille O'Neal (46)
| Shaquille O'Neal (15)
| Rick Fox (6)
| Staples Center18,997
| 16–1
|- style="background:#fcc;"
| 18
| December 7
| @ Sacramento
| L 91–97
| Shaquille O'Neal (31)
| Shaquille O'Neal (16)
| Shaquille O'Neal (5)
| ARCO Arena17,317
| 16–2
|- style="background:#fcc;"
| 19
| December 11
| Seattle
| L 93–104
| Shaquille O'Neal (37)
| Shaquille O'Neal (16)
| Derek Fisher (8)
| Staples Center18,997
| 16–3
|- style="background:#cfc;"
| 20
| December 14
| L.A. Clippers
| W 110–80
| Shaquille O'Neal (28)
| Shaquille O'Neal (15)
| Kobe Bryant (7)
| Staples Center18,997
| 17–3
|- style="background:#cfc;"
| 21
| December 16
| Golden State
| W 101–85
| Kobe Bryant (28)
| Shaquille O'Neal (7)
| Shaquille O'Neal (6)
| Staples Center18,997
| 18–3
|- style="background:#cfc;"
| 22
| December 20
| @ Houston
| W 107–101
| Kobe Bryant (27)
| Shaquille O'Neal (14)
| Bryant & Horry (5)
| Compaq Center16,285
| 19–3
|- style="background:#fcc;"
| 23
| December 21
| @ Memphis
| L 108–114
| Kobe Bryant (36)
| O'Neal & Walker (9)
| Bryant & Fox (6)
| Pyramid Arena19,405
| 19–4
|- style="background:#cfc;"
| 24
| December 25
| Philadelphia
| W 88–82
| Samaki Walker (18)
| Bryant & Horry (11)
| Kobe Bryant (9)
| Staples Center18,997
| 20–4
|- style="background:#fcc;"
| 25
| December 26
| @ Golden State
| L 90–101
| Kobe Bryant (39)
| Slava Medvedenko (8)
| Kobe Bryant (5)
| The Arena in Oakland20,036
| 20–5
|- style="background:#fcc;"
| 26
| December 28
| Toronto
| L 86–89
| Kobe Bryant (26)
| Samaki Walker (14)
| Kobe Bryant (6)
| Staples Center18,997
| 20–6
|- style="background:#cfc;"
| 27
| December 30
| Houston
| W 114–90
| Bryant & Fox (16)
| Robert Horry (11)
| Kobe Bryant (11)
| Staples Center18,997
| 21–6

|- style="background:#cfc;"
| 28
| January 2
| @ Denver
| W 87–86
| Kobe Bryant (28)
| Samaki Walker (11)
| Rick Fox (6)
| Pepsi Center17,932
| 22–6
|- style="background:#cfc;"
| 29
| January 4
| Phoenix
| W 118–86
| Shaquille O'Neal (24)
| Samaki Walker (10)
| Kobe Bryant (6)
| Staples Center18,997
| 23–6
|- style="background:#cfc;"
| 30
| January 6
| @ Toronto
| W 109–89
| Kobe Bryant (31)
| Samaki Walker (10)
| 3 players tied (4)
| Air Canada Centre19,800
| 24–6
|- style="background:#cfc;"
| 31
| January 8
| @ Detroit
| W 121–92
| Shaquille O'Neal (28)
| Shaquille O'Neal (10)
| Kobe Bryant (6)
| The Palace of Auburn Hills22,076
| 25–6
|- style="background:#cfc;"
| 32
| January 9
| @ Indiana
| W 109–90
| Kobe Bryant (31)
| Samaki Walker (13)
| Derek Fisher (6)
| Conseco Fieldhouse18,345
| 26–6
|- style="background:#fcc;"
| 33
| January 11
| @ Minnesota
| L 102–120
| Shaquille O'Neal (29)
| Samaki Walker (9)
| Rick Fox (9)
| Target Center19,806
| 26–7
|- style="background:#fcc;"
| 34
| January 12
| @ Chicago
| L 104–106 (OT)
| Derek Fisher (28)
| Robert Horry (13)
| Kobe Bryant (9)
| United Center23,147
| 26–8
|- style="background:#cfc;"
| 35
| January 14
| Memphis
| W 120–81
| Kobe Bryant (56)
| Robert Horry (11)
| Rick Fox (7)
| Staples Center18,997
| 27–8
|- style="background:#fcc;"
| 36
| January 16
| Miami
| L 96–102
| Kobe Bryant (29)
| Samaki Walker (13)
| Kobe Bryant (7)
| Staples Center18,997
| 27–9
|- style="background:#cfc;"
| 37
| January 19
| @ San Antonio
| W 98–81
| Kobe Bryant (28)
| 3 players tied (7)
| Kobe Bryant (5)
| Alamodome33,544
| 28–9
|- style="background:#fcc;"
| 38
| January 22
| Denver
| L 91–107
| Shaquille O'Neal (40)
| Shaquille O'Neal (11)
| Kobe Bryant (6)
| Staples Center18,997
| 28–10
|- style="background:#fcc;"
| 39
| January 23
| @ L.A. Clippers
| L 90–95
| Kobe Bryant (27)
| Samaki Walker (12)
| Derek Fisher (5)
| Staples Center20,309
| 28–11
|- style="background:#cfc;"
| 40
| January 25
| San Antonio
| W 94–91
| Kobe Bryant (27)
| Shaquille O'Neal (15)
| Kobe Bryant (6)
| Staples Center18,997
| 29–11
|- style="background:#fcc;"
| 41
| January 27
| @ Philadelphia
| L 87–93
| Shaquille O'Neal (26)
| Shaquille O'Neal (11)
| Rick Fox (6)
| First Union Center20,909
| 29–12
|- style="background:#cfc;"
| 42
| January 29
| @ Atlanta
| W 127–93
| Kobe Bryant (32)
| Samaki Walker (12)
| Fox & Hunter (4)
| Philips Arena19,742
| 30–12
|- style="background:#cfc;"
| 43
| January 30
| @ Orlando
| W 111–93
| Shaquille O'Neal (30)
| Shaquille O'Neal (14)
| Rick Fox (5)
| TD Waterhouse Centre17,248
| 31–12

|- style="background:#cfc;"
| 44
| February 1
| @ Memphis
| W 100–85
| Shaquille O'Neal (26)
| Shaquille O'Neal (10)
| Rick Fox (7)
| Pyramid Arena19,405
| 32–12
|- style="background:#cfc;"
| 45
| February 3
| @ Dallas
| W 101–94
| Shaquille O'Neal (31)
| Shaquille O'Neal (13)
| Robert Horry (8)
| American Airlines Center20,179
| 33–12
|- style="background:#fcc;"
| 46
| February 6
| Chicago
| L 89–97
| Kobe Bryant (38)
| Samaki Walker (14)
| Rick Fox (5)
| Staples Center18,997
| 33–13
|- align="center"
|colspan="9" bgcolor="#bbcaff"|All-Star Break
|- style="background:#cfc;"
|- bgcolor="#bbffbb"
|- style="background:#cfc;"
| 47
| February 12
| Washington
| W 103–94
| Kobe Bryant (23)
| Kobe Bryant (11)
| Kobe Bryant (15)
| Staples Center18,997
| 34–13
|- style="background:#cfc;"
| 48
| February 14
| @ Seattle
| W 92–87
| Kobe Bryant (23)
| Fox & George (8)
| Kobe Bryant (10)
| KeyArena17,072
| 35–13
|- style="background:#fcc;"
| 49
| February 15
| Atlanta
| L 90–93
| Kobe Bryant (21)
| 3 players tied (7)
| Kobe Bryant (10)
| Staples Center18,997
| 35–14
|- style="background:#fcc;"
| 50
| February 17
| @ Portland
| L 105–111
| Kobe Bryant (28)
| Robert Horry (8)
| Lindsey Hunter (7)
| Rose Garden20,580
| 35–15
|- style="background:#fcc;"
| 51
| February 19
| Boston
| L 108–109
| Kobe Bryant (27)
| Shaquille O'Neal (17)
| Lindsey Hunter (9)
| Staples Center18,997
| 35–16
|- style="background:#cfc;"
| 52
| February 21
| @ Cleveland
| W 104–97
| Kobe Bryant (32)
| Bryant & Horry (6)
| Kobe Bryant (6)
| Gund Arena20,562
| 36–16
|- style="background:#cfc;"
| 53
| February 22
| @ Charlotte
| W 96–94
| Shaquille O'Neal (31)
| Rick Fox (11)
| Kobe Bryant (6)
| Charlotte Coliseum23,799
| 37–16
|- style="background:#cfc;"
| 54
| February 24
| @ New York
| W 107–91
| Shaquille O'Neal (30)
| Shaquille O'Neal (15)
| Bryant & O'Neal (5)
| Madison Square Garden19,763
| 38–16
|- style="background:#cfc;"
| 55
| February 26
| @ Milwaukee
| W 99–89
| Shaquille O'Neal (28)
| Shaquille O'Neal (13)
| Kobe Bryant (6)
| Bradley Center18,717
| 39–16
|- style="background:#fcc;"
| 56
| February 27
| @ Minnesota
| L 101–112
| Shaquille O'Neal (27)
| Shaquille O'Neal (8)
| Kobe Bryant (11)
| Target Center19,769
| 39–17

|- style="background:#cfc;"
| 57
| March 1
| Indiana
| W 96–84
| Shaquille O'Neal (33)
| Shaquille O'Neal (12)
| Robert Horry (6)
| Staples Center18,897
| 40–17
|- style="background:#cfc;"
| 58
| March 3
| Houston
| W 95–79
| Shaquille O'Neal (36)
| Shaquille O'Neal (14)
| Shaquille O'Neal (7)
| Staples Center18,997
| 41–17
|- style="background:#cfc;"
| 59
| March 5
| New Jersey
| W 101–92
| Shaquille O'Neal (40)
| Robert Horry (13)
| Horry & O'Neal (4)
| Staples Center18,997
| 42–17
|- style="background:#fcc;"
| 60
| March 6
| @ Utah
| L 84–92
| Shaquille O'Neal (28)
| Shaquille O'Neal (12)
| Bryant & Hunter (4)
| Delta Center19,911
| 42–18
|- style="background:#cfc;"
| 61
| March 10
| New York
| W 117–103
| Shaquille O'Neal (40)
| Robert Horry (13)
| Kobe Bryant (7)
| Staples Center18,997
| 43–18
|- style="background:#cfc;"
| 62
| March 12
| Charlotte
| W 107–66
| Kobe Bryant (23)
| Shaquille O'Neal (10)
| Bryant & Richmond (4)
| Staples Center18,997
| 44–18
|- style="background:#cfc;"
| 63
| March 14
| @ Golden State
| W 110–102
| Shaquille O'Neal (40)
| Shaquille O'Neal (13)
| Bryant & Fox (6)
| The Arena in Oakland20,042
| 45–18
|- style="background:#cfc;"
| 64
| March 15
| L.A. Clippers
| W 98–92
| Kobe Bryant (33)
| Shaquille O'Neal (13)
| Fox & Horry (5)
| Staples Center18,997
| 46–18
|- style="background:#cfc;"
| 65
| March 17
| Dallas
| W 105–103
| Shaquille O'Neal (28)
| Bryant & O'Neal (9)
| Kobe Bryant (11)
| Staples Center18,997
| 47–18
|- style="background:#fcc;"
| 66
| March 19
| @ Dallas
| L 98–114
| Shaquille O'Neal (32)
| Shaquille O'Neal (10)
| Horry & Richmond (4)
| American Airlines Center20,112
| 47–19
|- style="background:#fcc;"
| 67
| March 20
| @ San Antonio
| L 90–108
| Kobe Bryant (20)
| Shaquille O'Neal (10)
| Brian Shaw (5)
| Alamodome30,775
| 47–20
|- style="background:#cfc;"
| 68
| March 22
| Detroit
| W 94–82
| Shaquille O'Neal (28)
| Horry & Walker (10)
| Kobe Bryant (7)
| Staples Center18,997
| 48–20
|- style="background:#cfc;"
| 69
| March 24
| @ Sacramento
| W 97–96
| Kobe Bryant (29)
| O'Neal & Shaw (7)
| Shaquille O'Neal (6)
| ARCO Arena17,317
| 49–20
|- style="background:#cfc;"
| 70
| March 26
| Cleveland
| W 121–116
| Shaquille O'Neal (19)
| Shaquille O'Neal (8)
| Robert Horry (6)
| Staples Center18,997
| 50–20
|- style="background:#fcc;"
| 71
| March 27
| @ Phoenix
| L 106–118
| Kobe Bryant (36)
| Shaquille O'Neal (11)
| Robert Horry (6)
| America West Arena19,023
| 50–21
|- style="background:#cfc;"
| 72
| March 29
| Portland
| W 91–79
| Bryant & O'Neal (34)
| Samaki Walker (17)
| Kobe Bryant (6)
| Staples Center18,997
| 51–21
|- style="background:#cfc;"
| 73
| March 31
| San Antonio
| W 96–95
| Kobe Bryant (31)
| 3 players tied (9)
| Robert Horry (4)
| Staples Center18,997
| 52–21

|- style="background:#cfc;"
| 74
| April 2
| @ Washington
| W 113–93
| Shaquille O'Neal (22)
| Shaquille O'Neal (18)
| Kobe Bryant (6)
| MCI Center20,674
| 53–21
|- style="background:#fcc;"
| 75
| April 3
| @ New Jersey
| L 92–94
| Kobe Bryant (33)
| Samaki Walker (14)
| Bryant & Shaw (3)
| Continental Airlines Arena20,049
| 53–22
|- style="background:#fcc;"
| 76
| April 5
| @ Boston
| L 81–99
| Kobe Bryant (26)
| Robert Horry (9)
| 5 players tied (2)
| Fleet Center18,624
| 53–23
|- style="background:#cfc;"
| 77
| April 7
| @ Miami
| W 96–88
| Shaquille O'Neal (40)
| Bryant & O'Neal (11)
| Robert Horry (7)
| American Airlines Arena19,600
| 54–23
|- style="background:#cfc;"
| 78
| April 9
| Utah
| W 112–82
| Bryant & O'Neal (22)
| Robert Horry (11)
| Kobe Bryant (5)
| Staples Center18,997
| 55–23
|- style="background:#cfc;"
| 79
| April 11
| Minnesota
| W 96–83
| Shaquille O'Neal (32)
| Samaki Walker (10)
| Derek Fisher (4)
| Staples Center18,997
| 56–23
|- style="background:#fcc;"
| 80
| April 14
| @ Portland
| L 120–128 (2OT)
| Shaquille O'Neal (36)
| Shaquille O'Neal (11)
| Kobe Bryant (9)
| Rose Garden20,580
| 56–24
|- style="background:#cfc;"
| 81
| April 15
| Seattle
| W 111–104
| Shaquille O'Neal (41)
| Shaquille O'Neal (11)
| Brian Shaw (6)
| Staples Center18,997
| 57–24
|- style="background:#cfc;"
| 82
| April 17
| Sacramento
| W 109–95
| Bryant & O'Neal (21)
| Samaki Walker (15)
| Kobe Bryant (5)
| Staples Center18,997
| 58–24

Playoffs

|- align="center" bgcolor="#ccffcc"
| 1
| April 21
| Portland
| W 95–87
| Kobe Bryant (34)
| Shaquille O'Neal (9)
| Rick Fox (6)
| Staples Center18,997
| 1–0
|- align="center" bgcolor="#ccffcc"
| 2
| April 25
| Portland
| W 103–96
| Shaquille O'Neal (31)
| Shaquille O'Neal (14)
| Kobe Bryant (5)
| Staples Center18,997
| 2–0
|- align="center" bgcolor="#ccffcc"
| 3
| April 28
| @ Portland
| W 92–91
| Kobe Bryant (25)
| Shaquille O'Neal (11)
| Bryant & O'Neal (7)
| Rose Garden20,580
| 3–0

|- align="center" bgcolor="#ccffcc"
| 1
| May 5
| San Antonio
| W 86–80
| Shaquille O'Neal (23)
| Shaquille O'Neal (17)
| 3 players tied (4)
| Staples Center18,997
| 1–0
|- align="center" bgcolor="#ffcccc"
| 2
| May 7
| San Antonio
| L 85–88
| Kobe Bryant (26)
| Robert Horry (11)
| Kobe Bryant (6)
| Staples Center18,997
| 1–1
|- align="center" bgcolor="#ccffcc"
| 3
| May 10
| @ San Antonio
| W 99–89
| Kobe Bryant (31)
| Shaquille O'Neal (15)
| Kobe Bryant (6)
| Alamodome35,520
| 2–1
|- align="center" bgcolor="#ccffcc"
| 4
| May 12
| @ San Antonio
| W 87–85
| Kobe Bryant (28)
| Shaquille O'Neal (11)
| Shaquille O'Neal (5)
| Alamodome32,342
| 3–1
|- align="center" bgcolor="#ccffcc"
| 5
| May 14
| San Antonio
| W 93–87
| Kobe Bryant (26)
| Shaquille O'Neal (11)
| Rick Fox (7)
| Staples Center18,997
| 4–1

|- align="center" bgcolor="#ccffcc"
| 1
| May 18
| @ Sacramento
| W 106–99
| Kobe Bryant (30)
| Shaquille O'Neal (9)
| 3 players tied (5)
| ARCO Arena17,317
| 1–0
|- align="center" bgcolor="#ffcccc"
| 2
| May 20
| @ Sacramento
| L 90–96
| Shaquille O'Neal (35)
| Robert Horry (20)
| Fisher & Horry (4)
| ARCO Arena17,317
| 1–1
|- align="center" bgcolor="#ffcccc"
| 3
| May 24
| Sacramento
| L 90–103
| Kobe Bryant (22)
| Shaquille O'Neal (19)
| Brian Shaw (7)
| Staples Center18,997
| 1–2
|- align="center" bgcolor="#ccffcc"
| 4
| May 26
| Sacramento
| W 100–99
| Shaquille O'Neal (27)
| Shaquille O'Neal (18)
| Robert Horry (5)
| Staples Center18,997
| 2–2
|- align="center" bgcolor="#ffcccc"
| 5
| May 28
| @ Sacramento
| L 91–92
| Kobe Bryant (30)
| Robert Horry (11)
| 3 players tied (3)
| ARCO Arena17,317
| 2–3
|- align="center" bgcolor="#ccffcc"
| 6
| May 31
| Sacramento
| W 106–102
| Shaquille O'Neal (41)
| Shaquille O'Neal (17)
| Bryant & Horry (5)
| Staples Center18,997
| 3–3
|- align="center" bgcolor="#ccffcc"
| 7
| June 2
| @ Sacramento
| W 112–106 (OT)
| Shaquille O'Neal (35)
| Rick Fox (14)
| Bryant & Fox (7)
| ARCO Arena17,317
| 4–3

|- align="center" bgcolor="#ccffcc"
| 1
| June 5
| New Jersey
| W 99–94
| Shaquille O'Neal (36)
| Shaquille O'Neal (16)
| Kobe Bryant (6)
| Staples Center18,997
| 1–0
|- align="center" bgcolor="#ccffcc"
| 2
| June 7
| New Jersey
| W 106–83
| Shaquille O'Neal (40)
| Shaquille O'Neal (12)
| Shaquille O'Neal (8)
| Staples Center18,997
| 2–0
|- align="center" bgcolor="#ccffcc"
| 3
| June 9
| @ New Jersey
| W 106–103
| Kobe Bryant (36)
| Shaquille O'Neal (11)
| Derek Fisher (6)
| Continental Airlines Arena19,215
| 3–0
|- align="center" bgcolor="#ccffcc"
| 4
| June 12
| @ New Jersey
| W 113–107
| Shaquille O'Neal (34)
| Shaquille O'Neal (10)
| Kobe Bryant (8)
| Continental Airlines Arena19,296
| 4–0

NBA Finals

Summary
The following scoring summary is written in a line score format, except that the quarter numbers are replaced by game numbers.

Aspects
Amid tensions between co-captains Shaquille O'Neal and Kobe Bryant, the franchise had another stellar season, finishing 58–24 (.707), good for second in the Pacific Division and earning the third seed in the Western Conference. Bryant and O'Neal were voted starters in the 2002 NBA All-Star Game, where Bryant won the game MVP trophy in his hometown Philadelphia. The duo appeared on the All-NBA First Team and Bryant was honored with an NBA All-Defensive Second Team selection.

Entering the 2001–02 season, the New Jersey Nets were enduring a three-year playoff drought and had a 73–141 record over that span. In 1999, the Nets hired Rod Thorn as team president and immediately, he hired the recently retired Byron Scott to coach New Jersey. Thorn then dealt for Stephon Marbury in a three-team trade with the Milwaukee Bucks and Minnesota Timberwolves, trading Sam Cassell away to the Bucks.  Due to the Nets' 31–51 season in 1999–00 season, they had the first overall pick in the 2000 NBA draft, which they used to select power forward Kenyon Martin out of the University of Cincinnati. Despite the reshuffling of the roster and a Rookie of the Year season for Martin, New Jersey struggled, ending the season with a 26–56 (.317) record, and were bestowed the 7th pick in the upcoming draft.

With another lottery pick, Thorn dealt it to the Houston Rockets for draftees Richard Jefferson, Jason Collins and Brandon Armstrong. The next day, Phoenix Suns owner Jerry Colangelo announced a franchise-shaking trade; Phoenix would swap their point guard Jason Kidd for his New Jersey counterpart Stephon Marbury.

With the Princeton offense installed from the coaching staff, the Nets rebounded to a 52–30 (.634) mark, a twenty-six-win improvement from the last season, and clinched the number-one seed in the Eastern Conference. Kidd finished the season awarded with first team spots on both the All-NBA and All-Defensive Teams and was selected for his fifth All-Star game. He also finished runner-up to San Antonio Spurs power forward Tim Duncan in the Most Valuable Player voting. Richard Jefferson was an All-Rookie second team selection and Thorn, the architect of the franchise's resurgence, was awarded NBA Executive of the Year.

Game One
Wednesday, June 5, 2002, 6:00 at the Staples Center.

Los Angeles's Staples Center sold out for the inaugural game of the 2002 NBA Finals, with nearly 19,000 on hand. The Nets trotted out a lineup of Kidd, Kittles, Martin, Van Horn and MacCulloth to hold up against the two-time defending and heavily favored champions. The Lakers brought out Derek Fisher, Rick Fox, Shaquille O'Neal, Robert Horry, and Kobe Bryant, who drew the assignment of guarding Kidd. New Jersey head coach Byron Scott, a member of the Showtime Lakers, received a standing ovation.

Taking advantage of a late arrival to the arena by New Jersey, L.A. dominated the first 17 minutes of play with a 42-19 score by the 6:41 mark in the second quarter. From that point on, the Nets went on a 17–6 to close the lead to a respectable 12. They had no answer for O'Neal, however, who had bullied MacCulloth into 16 points and 6 rebounds by half-time. The Nets outscored the Lakers in the third but stood steadfast as Bryant scored 11 of his 22 in the third.

New Jersey battled back, coming as close as three several times in the final quarter. Desperate to take the lead, they utilized the "Hack-a-Shaq" strategy midway in the fourth. It backfired, as O'Neal was 5–8 from the free throw line and had 16 points and 9 rebounds in the period alone.

New Jersey was doomed by their late start and poor shooting. The Nets, who shot 45% from the field and 74% on free throws were 39% and 57% respectively. Kidd finished with a triple–double, the 26th in Finals history and the first since Charles Barkley's in the 1993 series.

Recap

Game Two
Friday, June 7, 2002, 6:00 at the Staples Center.

The second game was more of statement as the Lakers clobbered the Nets by a score of 106-83 thanks to Shaquille O'Neal's 40 points, 12 rebounds, and 8 assists.

Recap

Game Three
Sunday, June 9, 2002, 8:30 at the Continental Airlines Arena.

Game Three would prove to a hard fought game (much like the first game of the series) as the Lakers and Nets would trade leads throughout the game but thanks to Kobe Bryant's 36 points, 6 rebounds, 4 assists and 2 blocks the Lakers prevail by a score of 106-103 to take a commanding 3-0 series lead.

Recap

Game Four
Wednesday, June 12, 2002, 9:00 at the Continental Airlines Arena.

Despite this being a hard fought battle (much like the previous game and as well as the first game of the series) the Lakers still won game four and the championship, giving Phil Jackson his Red Auerbach-tying ninth title and the Lakers their third consecutive title (and fourteenth overall) making them the fifth team to win three consecutive titles and denying the Nets their first ever championship since the franchise moved to East Rutherford.

Recap

Player statistics

Season

Playoffs

Award winners
 Shaquille O'Neal, NBA Finals Most Valuable Player
 Shaquille O'Neal, All-NBA First Team
 Shaquille O'Neal, League Leader, FG%, 57.9
 Kobe Bryant, All-NBA First Team
 Kobe Bryant, NBA All-Defensive Second Team
 Kobe Bryant, NBA All-Star Game Most Valuable Player Award

Transactions

References

 Lakers on Database Basketball
 Lakers on Basketball Reference

Los
NBA championship seasons
Los Angeles Lakers seasons
Western Conference (NBA) championship seasons
Los Angle
Los Angle